Nuran Tanrıverdi (born in İzmir) is a Turkish architect and painter.

Nuran Tanrıverdi was born in İzmir, Turkey. She graduated from the Faculty of Art, Design and Architecture of the Ege University in 1978. As a registered architect, she went to Stuttgart, Germany, and worked there as an architect for three years. Afterwards, she worked back in her hometown, İzmir. In both locations, she continued to develop her painting and art experience in various studios of different well known Turkish and German artists. Currently, she continues her work in her own studio in Izmir. She has had 20 personal exhibitions.

Tanrıverdi has had exhibitions for her paintings in Izmir, Istanbul, and Ankara. Some of her paintings have also been displayed in different exhibitions in Stockholm, Moldova and Nahcivan. Different art collections, both in Turkey and abroad, contain works made by Tanrıverdi.

An exhibition of Tanrıverdis works were displayed at the grand opening of the Consulate General of Nakhchivan Exhibition Hall on Nov 26, 2010.

Style
Stylistically in her works that express the female body, she is said to show both abstract traits and those of impressionism. "Suitability", "elegance" and "elusiveness", but also "timelessness" and "serenity" are terms that have been used to describe her style.

Exhibitions
1974 İzmir Art and Sculpture Museum, İzmir
1988 İzmir Art and Sculpture Museum, İzmir
1990 İş Bank Galery, İzmir
1991 Gümrük Art Gallery, İzmir
1997 Çetin Emeç Art Gallery, İzmir
1998 İzmir Commerce Room Exhibition Hall, İzmir
1999 International Art Fair, Stockholm, Sweden
2001 Turgut Pura Art Gallery, İzmir
2001 İzmir Art and Sculpture Museum, İzmir
2002 Konak Municipality Art Gallery, İzmir
2003 French Culture Center, İzmir
2004 Sheraton Hotel, Çeşme, İzmir
2005 Kişinev Art Campus, Moldova
2005 AKM – 1. International Aegean Art Fair, İzmir
2005 Galeri Soyut, Ankara
2006 Galeri Artist, İstanbul
2006 Bodrum Cam Sanat Galerisi, Bodrum
2006 Atölye EN Sanat Galerisi, İzmir
2007 İzmir Ticaret Odası Sanat Galerisi, İzmir
2008 Sheraton, Ankara
2008 Galeri Soyut, Ankara
2010 Çankaya Belediyesi Çağdaş Sanatlar Mrk., Ankara
2010 Kedi Sanat Galerisi, İzmir
2010 Artpoint Galeri, İstanbul
2010 Ayna Galeri, Bodrum
2010 The Marmara Hotel, Bodrum
2011 Wine Way Art Gallery Çeşme Marina, Çeşme
2011 Turkish Consulate General Nahcivan
2013 Turkish Consulate General Bregenz, Austria,
2018 Chamber of Architects, Izmir,
2018 Izmir Chamber of Commerce

References

Sources

Living people
People from İzmir
Ege University alumni
Turkish architects
Turkish women painters
Date of birth missing (living people)
21st-century Turkish women artists
Year of birth missing (living people)